The Celts were Iron Age inhabitants of Europe.

Celt, Celts or Celtae may also refer to:

Language and ethnicity
 Celts (modern)
 Celtic languages
 Celtic nations
 Names of the Celts

Arts and entertainment
 The Celts (1987 TV series), a 1987 BBC documentary series
 The Celts (2000  TV series), a 2000 S4C documentary series
 "The Celts" (song), by Enya, 1987 
 The Celts (album), a 1992 re-release of Enya
 Celtae (band), a Canadian band formed in 2001
 The Celts: First Masters of Europe, a 1992 illustrated book by Christiane Éluère

Other uses
Celt (tool), in archaeology
Celt, Missouri, a place in the U.S.
Rattleback, or (rebellious) celt, a semi-ellipsoidal top
, later RMS Celt, a 19th-century steamship
Cincinnati Celts, an American football team
California Extremely Large Telescope, a proposed telescope
CELT, an audio compression format
Corpus of Electronic Texts, an online database of Irish texts

See also

Celtic (disambiguation)
Gaels
Insular art